"Calling Hong Kong" was the second single by Orange County pop punk band Supernova, released on 7" by Goldenrod Records in 1993.

Tracks 1 & 2 were included on the 2001 compilation CD Pop as a Weapon.

Track listing
All lyrics written by Supernova.

Side A:
Calling Hong Kong - 2:27
Side B:
Chewbacca - 1:21
Pop As A Weapon

Personnel
Art Mitchell - Vocals, bass guitar
Hayden 'Hank' Thais - Guitar, vocals
Dave Collins - Drums, vocals

Cover version
 "Calling Hong Kong" was covered by Man or Astro-man? on their 1995 album, Intravenous Television Continuum.

Supernova (American band) songs
1993 singles
1993 songs